Falcuna margarita is a butterfly in the family Lycaenidae. It is found in Cameroon, the Republic of the Congo, Gabon and the Democratic Republic of the Congo (Ituri and Shaba). The habitat consists of primary forests.

References

Butterflies described in 1904
Poritiinae